Princeton Secondary is a public high school in Princeton, British Columbia part of School District 58 Nicola-Similkameen.

History
The current school building was constructed on the bluff above the town next to Princeton Aerodrome in 1981. It replaced the old high school located in town adjacent to the highway. The old school subsequently burned down in 1985.

The school was rented out to the Canadian Forces in the summer to house the Air Cadet Gliding School until 1992.

References

External links
School Reports - Ministry of Education
 Class Size
 Satisfaction Survey
 School Performance
 Skills Assessment

High schools in British Columbia
Educational institutions in Canada with year of establishment missing
1981 establishments in British Columbia
Educational institutions established in 1981